A list of Bangladeshi films released in 1997.

Releases

See also

1997 in Bangladesh

References

Film
Bangladesh
 1997